is a railway station in Sumiyoshi-ku, Osaka, Osaka Prefecture, Japan.

Lines
Nankai Electric Railway
Kōya Line
Hankai Tramway
Uemachi Line (Tezukayama Sanchome Station)

Adjacent stations

External links
  Tezukayama Station from Nankai Electric Railway website

Railway stations in Japan opened in 1934
Railway stations in Osaka Prefecture